Acanthopini is a tribe of mantises in the family Acanthopidae. Ii is the only tribe in the subfamily Acanthopinae and contains eight genera and 37 species.

Genera
The following genera are recognised in the tribe Acanthopini:

Acanthops (Serville, 1831)
Decimiana (Uvarov, 1940)
Lagrecacanthops Roy, 2004
Metacanthops Agudelo, Maldaner & Rafael, 2019
Metilia (Stal, 1877)
Miracanthops Roy, 2004
Plesiacanthops Chopard, 1913
Pseudacanthops (Saussure, 1870)

See also
List of mantis genera and species

References

Acanthopidae